A steam generator is a form of low water-content boiler, similar to a flash steam boiler. The usual construction is as a spiral coil of water-tube, arranged as a single, or monotube, coil. Circulation is once-through and pumped under pressure, as a forced-circulation boiler. The narrow-tube construction, without any large-diameter drums or tanks, means that they are safe from the effects of explosion, even if worked at high pressures. The pump flowrate is adjustable, according to the quantity of steam required at that time. The burner output is throttled to maintain a constant working temperature. The burner output required varies according to the quantity of water being evaporated: this can be either adjusted by open-loop control according to the pump throughput, or by a closed-loop control to maintain the measured temperature.

They are used as auxiliary boilers on ships.

Types

Stone-Vapor 
One of the best-known designs is the Stone-Vapor. The inner casing of the boiler forms a vertical bell, with an outer airtight cylindrical casing. The oil or gas burner is mounted at the top, above the coils, and facing downwards. The heating element is a single tube, arranged into a number of helical cylinders. The first helices (in the flow direction) are small-diameter tubes, wrapped in large diameter turns. Succeeding turns are coiled inside this and the tube is of progressively increasing diameter, to allow for a constant flow rate as the water evaporates into steam and forms bubbles. The steam outlet is from the final turn at the bottom of the inner helix. The outlet is approximately 90% steam (by mass) and residual water is separated by passing it through a steam-water separator. The exhaust gases turn upwards and flow over the outside of the bell, usually passing additional helices that are used as an initial feedwater heater.

Clayton 
The Clayton steam generator is similar to the Stone-Vapor, but the burner and flow directions are reversed. The heating coil is mounted within a simple cylindrical casing. Rather than helical, cylindrical layers, the Clayton coils are arranged as layers of flat spirals. Water is pumped into the top layers and forced downwards. Again, the tube diameter increases in steps, as evaporation takes place. The final turns form a single closely spaced helical cylinder around the burner as a water-wall furnace and is heated by radiant heat. The steam output is passed through a centrifugal separator and a dry steam quality of 99.5% is claimed.

See also 
 Steam generator (railroad)

Note

References 

Steam boilers
Boilers
Marine steam propulsion
Steam generators